Thrilla is an album from Christian hip-hop artist Mr. Del. It was released on June 30, 2009.

Track listing

 "Want It" - 4:42
 "More Than a Conqueror" - 4:16
 "Crunk Az Me" - 4:12
 "Panic Room (True& Mot!)" - 4:13
 "Rock It Out" - 4:01
 "Spread the Gospel" - 3:19
 "Checkin My S.W.A.G" - 4:39
 "Get Dom" - 4:26
 "Out There" - 5:28
 "Blessed Fresh" - 4:13
 "This Is It" - 2:44
 "Step Forward" - 2:46
 "U Can Do It 2" - 3:18
 "Faith Walk" - 3:57
 "Rite Back" - 4:17
 "Reverse the Curse" - 3:22
 "Don't Do It" - 4:50
 "Run Away (True & Mot!)" - 3:51
 "My Life Rated 'R' (Real)" - 2:42
 "Indescribable" - 3:41

Awards

The album was nominated for a Dove Award for Rap/Hip-Hop Album of the Year at the 41st GMA Dove Awards.

Chart performance

The album peaked at #33 on Billboard's Gospel Albums.

Notes

External links
 Mr. Del Official MySpace Page
 Thrilla on Amazon.com

2009 albums